The fleet of locomotives in Pakistan currently consists solely of diesel locomotives owned and operated by Pakistan Railways. Steam locomotives are no longer used in Pakistan, except in heritage trains. All locomotives are serviced at the Pakistan Locomotive Factory in Risalpur, Khyber Pakhtunkhwa.

Classification

Diesel locomotives
Not all the locomotives in this list are in service as some may have been renumbered.

Electric locomotives

Pakistan Railways has 29 electric locomotives of class BCU30E numbered 7001–7029. These are British-built locomotives of 3,000 horsepower for 25 kV AC. They are stored out of use because the overhead lines are unserviceable, owing to theft of copper.

See also

Pakistan Railways
List of locomotive builders

References